Brockdish is a village and civil parish in the South Norfolk district of Norfolk, England. The village is situated on the River Waveney (south of which is Suffolk), and is about 3 miles (5 km) south-west of Harleston.

History
Brockdish's name is of Anglo-Saxon origin and derives from the Old English for enclosed land adjacent to a stream.

In the Domesday Book, Brockdish is described as consisting of 39 households belonging to William I and Bury St Edmunds Abbey. 

In 1996, the village was bypassed after the completion of a section of the A143.

Geography
According to the 2001 census the parish (including Thorpe Abbotts)  had a population of 605 in 265 households, the population increasing at the 2011 Census to 681. 

Brockdish is the highest point on the River Waveney from which canoes and kayaks can access the water, the entry point being at the foot of the common.

St. Peter and St. Paul Church
Brockdish's Parish Church is dedicated to Saint Peter and Saint Paul and is of Norman origin. The church was significantly remodelled in the Victorian Era in a faux-Medieval style.

Place of Interest
Brockdish originally had two public houses until the closure of 'The Greyhound' in 2000, leaving the remaining pub: 'The King's Head'.

Brockdish Primary School closed in 2016 due to falling pupil numbers, and was, at once, Norfolk's smallest primary school. Pupils today attend primary education in Pulham Market or Harleston. Today, the school building is put to use as the Waveney Heritage Centre, a charity dedicated to forwarding local history. Pupils usually pursue secondary education at Harleston Sancroft Academy.

Notable Residents
 Clementia Taylor, women's rights activist and political radical
 Elaine Murphy, Baroness Murphy

War Memorial
Brockdish War Memorial is a Gothic cross constructed out of Portland stone, located in St. Peter and St.Paul's Churchyard. It holds the following names for First World War:
 Second-Lieutenant Cecil W. M. White (1895-1915), 9th Battalion, Royal Norfolk Regiment
 Able-Seaman Edgar A. Butcher (1884-1918), Anson Battalion, Royal Naval Division
 Pioneer Harry Wilkinson (1894-1918), Royal Engineers
 Private Ernest E. Shemming (1887-1917), 4th Battalion, Bedfordshire Regiment
 Private Alfred E. Whiting (1883-1916), 7th Battalion, Border Regiment
 Private Robert W. Whiting (1888-1917), 1st Battalion, East Surrey Regiment
 Private William J. Day (1899-1917), 7th Battalion, East Surrey Regiment
 Private Frederick A. Licence (1891-1918), 2nd Battalion, Essex Regiment
 Private Frederick J. Read (1891-1916), 9th Battalion, Essex Regiment
 Private Alfred J. Fisher (1897-1918), 428th (Agricultural) Company, Labour Corps
 Private Albert V. Day (1894-1916), 1/9th (Queen Victoria's Rifles) Battalion, London Regiment
 Private William J. Read (1885-1917), 1/9th Battalion, Middlesex Regiment
 Private John N. Hines (1878-1915), 1st Battalion, Royal Norfolk Regiment
 Private Marshall H. Norman (1882-1916), 1st Battalion, Royal Norfolk Regiment
 Private George H. Bloomfield (1894-1917), 2nd Battalion, Royal Norfolk Regiment
 Private William B. Hines (1881-1916), 7th Battalion, Royal Norfolk Regiment
 Private Alfred Foulger (1893-1917), 8th Battalion, Royal Norfolk Regiment
 Private William Allum (1893-1917), 2nd Battalion, Northamptonshire Regiment
 Rifleman Frank V. Barkway (1896-1916), 12th Battalion, Rifle Brigade (The Prince Consort's Own)

And, the following for the Second World War:
 Private Clifford H. Debenham (1888-1941), 2nd Battalion, Royal Norfolk Regiment
 Private Bertie J. Flatman (1920-1943), 5th Battalion, Royal Norfolk Regiment

References

Further reading

 The Moated Grange: A History of South Norfolk Through the Story of one Home, 1300-2000 (2015), by Elaine Murphy, Baroness Murphy

External links

Villages in Norfolk
Civil parishes in Norfolk